The 2017 Maui Invitational Tournament was an early-season college basketball tournament that was played for the 34th time.  The tournament began in 1984, and was part of the 2017–18 NCAA Division I men's basketball season. The Championship Round was played at the Lahaina Civic Center in Maui, Hawaii from November 20 to 22. Opening round games previously played at campus sites were discontinued.

Notre Dame defeated Wichita State in the championship game to win the Tournament.

Bracket

References

Maui Invitational Tournament
Maui Invitational
Maui Invitational